State Trunk Highway 95 (often called Highway 95, STH-95 or WIS 95) is a  state highway in the west-central area of the US state of Wisconsin that runs east–west from near Neillsville to Fountain City.

Route description

WIS 95 starts in Neillsville with U.S. Highway 10 (US 10) going east–west and WIS 73, with which WIS 95 runs concurrently for  going north–south. (WIS 73 goes on US 10 for one block). After that, WIS 95 leaves WIS 73 and starts going east–west toward Merrillan. It then turns off to go east–west toward Arcadia. WIS 95 then goes east–west then north–south for  then goes back going east–west toward Fountain City where WIS 95 ends.

History
Initially, WIS 95 traveled from WIS 15 (later US 41; now US 45) in Oshkosh to WIS 18 (later US 10; now WIS 96/WIS 110) in Fremont via parts of present-day US 45, CTH-S, CTH-M, CTH-II, and WIS 110. Prior to 1926, no significant changes to the routing happened. Then, in 1926, WIS 95 moved off from the Oshkosh–Fremont route to the Fountain City–Neillsville route. The Fountain City–Neillsville route was previously signed as WIS 53 before 1926. This was done in favor of establishing two U.S. Highways: US 53 (which caused WIS 53 to be decommissioned due to its route number being duplicated) and US 110 (which filled in the pre-1926 alignment of WIS 95). The routing still remains like this to this day.

Major intersections

See also

References

External links

095
Transportation in Buffalo County, Wisconsin
Transportation in Trempealeau County, Wisconsin
Transportation in Jackson County, Wisconsin
Transportation in Clark County, Wisconsin
U.S. Route 45